KMWM is an FM radio station licensed to Woodrow Matthew Warren and is located in Alturas, California.

History
KMWM went on the air on 11 August 2016 changing to the call sign on July 7 2016 from KOGD prior to commencing operation. 

On August 14, 2013, the FCC granted a construction permit to L Topaz Enterprises, Inc for 101.7 mHz with an Effective Radiated Power of 51 kW.  The location of the transmitter was chosen with the attempt to cover the city of Alturas, California and have a listenable signal in Lakeview, Oregon. 

On May 22, 2014, L. Topaz sold the Construction Permit to Woodward Matthew Warren of Lakeview, Oregon for $25,000, $15,000 of which was in the form of a promissory note.  Unable to raise the funds to build the high power station Warren applied for a Construction Permit on July 26 2016 to build a 500 watt station colocated which his existing KALT-FM in Alturas. Warren filed for the license August 11, 2016 three days before the Construction permit was due to expire. Warren also owns KLCR-FM in Lakeview, Oregon

References

External links
 

Alturas, California
2016 establishments in California
MWM
Radio stations established in 2016